The SAI KZ VII Lærke (Danish: "Lark") was a light utility aircraft built in Denmark shortly after the Second World War. Based on the SAI KZ III air ambulance, the KZ VII was a strut-braced, high-wing monoplane of conventional design with an enclosed cabin for four seats. Fifty-six aircraft were built, and another 22 partially completed aircraft were destroyed in a factory fire in 1947. The Danish Air Force operated 10 of the type as trainers between 1950 and 1977.

Operators

Royal Danish Air Force

OLT Express Germany

Specifications

References

Further reading

External links

 Danmarks Flymuseum page on the KZ VII (in Danish)
 Уголок неба

1940s Danish civil utility aircraft
Skandinavisk Aero Industri aircraft
High-wing aircraft
Single-engined tractor aircraft
Aircraft first flown in 1946